Coya District is one of eight districts of the Calca Province in the Cusco Region of Peru.

Geography 
Some of the highest mountains of the district are listed below:

 Hatun Pukara
 Hatun Raqha Kay 
 Hatun Suyu Q'asa
 Ichhunayuq
 Quriqucha Punta
 Quriqucha Qaqa
 Q'umir
 Sirkapata
 Wanakawri
 Yawar Wak'a

Ethnic groups 
The people in the district are mainly indigenous citizens of Quechua descent. Quechua is the language which the majority of the population (79.19%) learnt to speak in childhood, 20.66% of the residents started speaking using the Spanish language (2007 Peru Census).

See also 
 Qhapaq Kancha
 Quriqucha

References